LAGB may refer to:

 Laparoscopic adjustable gastric band, an form of bariatric surgery
 Linguistics Association of Great Britain
 Low-angle grain boundary